Acleris yasudai is a species of moth of the family Tortricidae. It is found in Japan (Honshu). The wingspan is 20–21 mm. The larvae feed on Enkianthus campanullatus and Enkianthus campanullatus var. sikokianus.

References

yasudai
Moths of Japan
Moths described in 1966